The Lassen Street Olive Trees, also known as 76 Mature Olive Trees, are a Los Angeles Historic-Cultural Monument located in the Chatsworth community of the northwestern San Fernando Valley, in Los Angeles, Southern California.

History
An avenue (alleé) of Olive trees (Olea europaea) were planted in 1890 along a then dirt road by N. A. Grey, who owned property there.  They are believed to have been grown from cuttings taken from the Spanish Colonial c. 1800 planted olive orchard trees at the Mission San Fernando Rey de España across the Valley.  

When the site was designated a Historic-Cultural Monument in 1967, there were 76 olive trees along several blocks of western of Lassen Street.  According to the Chatsworth Daughters of the American Revolution chapter, there are 49 trees surviving/remaining in the 2010s.

See also
History of the San Fernando Valley
List of Los Angeles Historic-Cultural Monuments in the San Fernando Valley

References

External links

Chatsworth, Los Angeles
History of the San Fernando Valley
Los Angeles Historic-Cultural Monuments
Individual olive trees
Streets in the San Fernando Valley